Bottom Feeder is a 2007 American monster movie written and directed by Randy Daudlin. The film centers on a group of utility workers who have become trapped in the maze of tunnels underneath the city where they are stalked and killed by something terrible.

Plot
Billionaire Charles Deaver (Richard Fitzpatrick), who has been heavily disfigured by an automobile accident, seeks to save his life by investing in the work of Dr. Nathaniel Leech (James Binkley). Leech is a scientist developing a serum to regenerate dead cells, which he hopes to use to save his wife Miranda, who is dying of leukemia. When he presents the serum to Deaver, Leech explains that as the serum works, the patient will develop a ravenous hunger that must be treated with a special formula to avoid side effects. Deaver has his henchmen, including his top deputy Krendal (Wendy Anderson), brutally beat Leech; after Krendal shoots the doctor several times, Deaver orders his men to inject Leech with the serum and lock him in a tunnel system overnight, to see if the serum indeed works and regenerates him. As he does not have access to the accompanying formula, Leech's hunger quickly drives him to eat a rat and later a dog. He begins to mutate into a hybrid creature shortly thereafter.

A group of salvage workers led by Vince Stoker (Tom Sizemore) arrive at an abandoned hospital, hoping to find old equipment they can sell for quick cash. Stoker's niece, Sam (Amber Cull), is with the team for the first time. As they explore the hospital, they reach the tunnels beneath the building, which are coincidentally where Leech is trapped. Having now fully mutated into a giant, rat-like monster, Leech begins stalking and killing the workers. As their numbers dwindle, they too become trapped in the maze of tunnels and are forced to not only deal with the monster, but Deaver's men and Krendal, who Deaver has sent into the tunnels. Krendal is later revealed to be a double agent working for the government, whose mission is to acquire Leech's serum so it can be weaponized by the military.

When Stoker's remaining group encounters Krendal, she initially tries to capture and dispose of them, but she is forced to work together with them to survive when the monster attacks again. Stoker's friend, Otis (Martin Roach), manages to find equipment to use to fight the creature. Meanwhile, the monster manages to reach Deaver in his limousine and, remembering Deaver's betrayal of Leech, exacts revenge by decapitating Deaver. Down in the tunnels, Stoker, Sam and Krendal set timed explosives, intending to destroy the area to kill the creature. In order to buy Stoker and Sam time to escape, Krendal confronts the monster and is killed when it tears her jaw off. Otis returns with a large saw, and the group manage to finally kill the monster by cutting into its chest. Just as they finally kill the creature, however, the timers run out and the explosives detonate, killing Otis while Stoker and Sam barely survive.

Some time later, Stoker awakens in an unfamiliar hospital, where he learns from the doctor of Sam's survival. It quickly becomes apparent, however, that the reason why they survived is that they too have become infected with Leech's serum, due to the monster's blood splashing into their wounds as they killed it. The doctor, who is actually part of the government's operation, tells Stoker that he will be useful for the country as he connects a packet of the nutrient formula to Stoker's intravenous drip. He then leaves the room, leaving Stoker to cry out in pain from his overwhelming hunger.

Cast
 Tom Sizemore as Vince Stoker
 Wendy Anderson as Krendal
 Richard Fitzpatrick as Charles Deaver
 Amber Cull as Sam
 Martin Roach as Otis
 James Binkley as Nathaniel Leech
 Simon Northwood as Wilkes

Production

It was reported that the film's lead actor Tom Sizemore walked out before filming could be completed. The actor later returned to finish filming his remaining scenes.

Release
On March 30, 2007 the film's distributors posted an exclusive clip from the film on BDTV in order to promote the film's direct to video release later that year. 
Peace Arch Entertainment and Genius Entertainment released the film unrated on DVD on April 3, 2007.

Reception
Steve Barton from Dread Central  criticized the film's paper-thin story, and lack of sense, but also stated, "While certainly not a defining moment in terms of our genre, Bottom Feeder does enough right to keep even the most jaded viewer at least semi-entertained". Dave Murray from Arrow in the Head gave the film a score of 2/4, commending the film's acting, camerawork, setting, monster design, and twist ending. Murray concluded by stating that the film was "Recommended for fans of old school, mutant creature survival horror". Mike Long from DVD Talk noted that the film "struggles when the monster isn't on-screen", criticizing the film's opening as having "too much plot", lack of likable characters, and sense of repetition while the characters were in the tunnels. Long did, however, commend Anderson's and Fitzpatrick's performances, also stating that the film "never pretends to be anything more than a monster movie".

Digital Retribution.com awarded the film a score of three out of five stating, "Bottom Feeder is not as entertaining (or expensive) as Tom Sizemore's first star vehicle, The Relic, but fans of low budget creature features should find just enough here to keep them happy. Those who prefer complex plotting, slick production values, and non-mutating characters should probably try something else". Terror Hook.com gave the film a positive review applauding the film's acting, gore, and creature effects.

References

External links
 
 
 
 

2007 films
2007 direct-to-video films
2007 horror films
2000s monster movies
American direct-to-video films
American monster movies
Films shot in Ontario
Mad scientist films
2000s English-language films
2000s American films